Bruce Alexander Draper (October 2, 1940 — January 26, 1968) was a Canadian professional ice hockey centre who played in one National Hockey League game for the Toronto Maple Leafs during the 1962–63 NHL season.

Career statistics

Regular season and playoffs

See also
List of players who played only one game in the NHL

External links

1940 births
1968 deaths
Canadian ice hockey centres
Deaths from leukemia
Denver Invaders players
Hershey Bears players
Rochester Americans players
Ice hockey people from Toronto
Sudbury Wolves (EPHL) players
Toronto Maple Leafs players
Toronto St. Michael's Majors players